Andrew John Sommese (born 3 May 3, 1948 in New York City) is an American mathematician, specializing in algebraic geometry.

Sommese received in 1969 from Fordham University a bachelor's degree and in 1973 from Princeton University a PhD under Phillip Griffiths with thesis Algebraic properties of the period-mapping. As a postdoc Sommese was from 1973 to 1975 a Gibbs Instructor at Yale University and was for the academic year 1975–1976 at the Institute for Advanced Study. He became at Cornell University in 1975 an assistant professor and at the University of Notre Dame in 1979 an associate professor and in 1983 a full professor. At the University of Notre Dame he was from 1988 to 1992 the chair of the mathematics department and from 1987 to 1992 the co-director of the Center for Applied Mathematics. Since 1994 he is there Duncan Professor for mathematics.

Sommese deals with numerical algebraic geometry (solution of polynomial equation systems) with applications, e.g. in robotics. For such applications he, with colleagues, developed software (such as Bertini) and cluster-software (i.e. software for computer clusters). He also deals with the numerical analysis of systems of nonlinear differential equations.

He was a visiting professor at the University of Göttingen (1977) and the University of Bonn (1978/79) and a visiting scientist at the Max Planck Institute for Mathematics in Bonn.

In 1993 he received the Humboldt Prize. In 1973 he was a Sloan Research Fellow. From 1986 to 1993 he was a co-editor of Manuscripta Mathematica and since 2000 is a co-editor for Advances in Geometry. He was  elected a Fellow of the American Mathematical Society in 2012.

His doctoral students include Mark Andrea de Cataldo and Jaroslaw Wisniewski.

Selected publications
 with Bernard Shiffman: Vanishing theories on complex manifolds, Progress in Mathematics 56, Birkhäuser Verlag 1985
 with Mauro Beltrametti: The adjunction theory of complex projective varieties, De Gruyter 1995
 with Charles Wampler: Numerical solution of polynomial systems arising in engineering and science, World Scientific 2005
 as editor with Alicia Dickenstein and Frank-Olaf Schreyer: Algorithms in Algebraic Geometry, Springer Verlag 2008
 with Daniel J. Bates, Jonathan D. Hauenstein, and Charles W. Wampler: Numerically solving polynomial systems with Bertini, SIAM 2013 Bertini™ Home Page

References

External links
 Home page for Sommese at U. of Notre Dame

20th-century American mathematicians
21st-century American mathematicians
Fordham University alumni
Princeton University alumni
University of Notre Dame faculty
Fellows of the American Mathematical Society
1948 births
Living people
Scientists from New York City
Mathematicians from New York (state)
Cornell University faculty
Institute for Advanced Study visiting scholars
Yale University fellows